Amplicincia mixta is a moth of the subfamily Arctiinae. It was described by Heinrich Benno Möschler in 1886. It is found in Jamaica.

References

Moths described in 1886
Lithosiini
Moths of the Caribbean